Bømlo  is a municipality in the southwestern part of Vestland county, Norway. It is located in the traditional district of Sunnhordland. The administrative centre of the municipality is the village of Svortland. Other villages in Bømlo include Mosterhamn, Rubbestadneset, Lykling, and Langevåg. Most of the municipal residents live on the island of Bømlo, which makes up the majority of the land in the municipality.

Bømlo was actively involved in the Shetland bus operation during the Second World War. A 23-year-old male from Bømlo, Nils Nesse, was the first of the Shetland Bus men to be killed.

The  municipality is the 289th largest by area out of the 356 municipalities in Norway. Bømlo is the 97th most populous municipality in Norway with a population of 12,061.

General information

The municipality of Bømlo was established on 1 July 1916 when the old municipality of Finnås was divided into three smaller municipalities: Bømlo, Bremnes, and Moster. Initially, the municipality encompassed the southern part of the island of Bømlo and it had a population of 1,217. During the 1960s, there were many municipal mergers across Norway due to the work of the Schei Committee. On 1 January 1963, the municipalities of Bremnes (population: 4,829) and Moster (population: 1,834) were merged with Bømlo (population: 1,463) which together formed a new, larger municipality called Bømlo. On 1 January 1970, a small area along the Valvatnavågen bay on the island of Stord was transferred from Bømlo to the neighboring Stord Municipality. On 1 January 1995, the islands of Aga, Agasystra, Gisøya, Vikøya, Selsøy, Risøya, and many smaller surrounding islands (population: 225) were transferred from the neighboring Fitjar Municipality to Bømlo. These islands had recently been connected to Bømlo by road bridges which precipitated the municipal transfer.

Name
The municipality is named after the main island of Bømlo, possibly derived from bembel, meaning navel or stomach. In this context, it is believed that it refers to something thick or swollen, similar to the mountain formation of Siggjo (for other possible interpretations, see Bamble). Until 1918 the name was written Bømmel.

Coat of arms
The coat of arms was granted on 29 February 1980. Its colors include red and light grey, and illustrates the leaf of a water lily interlaced with a trefoil. The trefoil symbolizes the three former municipalities Bremnes, Moster, and Bømlo, which were united in 1963. The water lily leaf, however, was simply chosen as a decorative element without any further significance.

Churches
The Church of Norway has four parishes within the municipality of Bømlo. It is part of the Sunnhordland prosti (deanery) in the Diocese of Bjørgvin.

Geography

The municipality includes about 900 islands, islets, and skerries, although most are very small and uninhabited. The main island is also called Bømlo, and other notable islands in Bømlo municipality include Moster, Otterøya, Spyssøya, Goddo, and Espevær. The municipality lies north of the entrance to the Hardangerfjorden, south of the Selbjørnsfjorden, and west of the Stokksundet. The Innværfjorden is a small fjord that cuts into the island of Bømlo around the village of Rubbestadneset.

The large island of Stord lies to the east. Bømlo is connected to Stord by the Triangle Link, which has made transportation to and from the municipality easier and more effective.

Bømlo is commonly distinguished in respect to residential ares. These areas include Svortland (previously Bremnes), Søra-Bømlo (South-Bømlo), Rubbestadneset, Moster, Finnås, Gilje, Goddo, and Hiskjo. Svortland is the administrative centre where there are stores, a cultural centre, schools and official buildings, and is located a bit north of the centre of the island. Moster is on the other hand more to the east with a high percentage of Christians devoted to at least three different christian denominations.

Siggjo
At  in height, the mountain Siggjo is the highest mountain on the island of Bømlo. The rocks on Siggjo contain large amounts of the igneous rock rhyolite, which was used in the Stone Age to create armament and tools. They have found rhyolite from Siggjo as far north as the Trøndelag region of Norway. Siggjo is a popular attraction among locals and tourists.

Lykling
The Lykling village area has become a popular tourist attraction, mainly due to its history of extensive gold mining in Lyklingeberga. The discovery of gold in 1862 by a young shepherd, led to several constructions being built in the area. These were built by three major companies, mainly financed and run by English businessmen. In addition to the mining constructions, there was also built two hotels, one hotelship, several bakeries, and a number of retail stores. Mining activity started in 1882 and ended in 1910, lasting more than 25 years.

Climate
Bømlo, facing the North Sea, has a temperate oceanic climate (Cfb, marine west coast), with few temperature extremes. The wettest season is September - January, and the driest is April–July. The all-time high temperature is  recorded 26 July 2019. The all-time low is  recorded 11 January 1987. The five months June - October have never recorded overnight freezes. The average date for the last overnight freeze (low below ) in spring is March 19  and average date for first freeze in autumn is December 5, among the latest in Norway (1981-2010 average). The weather station at Slåtterøy lighthouse has been recording temperature since 1923.

Government
All municipalities in Norway, including Bømlo, are responsible for primary education (through 10th grade), outpatient health services, senior citizen services, unemployment and other social services, zoning, economic development, and municipal roads. The municipality is governed by a municipal council of elected representatives, which in turn elect a mayor. The municipality falls under the Haugaland og Sunnhordland District Court and the Gulating Court of Appeal.

Municipal council
The municipal council of Bømlo is made up of 27 representatives that are elected to four-year terms. The party breakdown of the council is as follows:

Mayor
The mayors of Bømlo (incomplete list):
2019–present: Sammy Olsen (Sp)
2011–2019: Odd Harald Hovland (Ap)
1999–2011: Inge Reidar Kallevåg (H)

Culture

Bømlo is regionally known for several musical theatres and other theatrical productions performed in Moster Amfi, a local amphitheatre. The most famous performance, Mostraspelet, surrounds the topics of how Christianity arrived to Norway via Bømlo, late during the first millennium.

In 1975, the island of Espevær became known for its conspirative 'UFO-Ring', a physical imprint to the ground supposedly made from a stationed UFO, which is still visible .

Sports
Many local youths are active in some form of sport or activity, either as a hobby, as part of education, or sometimes even with the specific goal of becoming a professional.

Association football is one of the most popular sports played by the male population on the island. In recent years, there has been an increasing number of female footballers as well. Children often start playing football at an early age, and many play active for several years. As their skills develop, they are systematically graded up (or down) in divisions, a type of ranking system. Notable soccer players, such as Arne Larsen Økland, Geirmund Brendesæter, and Gunnar Meling, started their careers in Bremnes IL, one of the local sports clubs. Former top player and current coach for SK Brann, Mons Ivar Mjelde, had a brief stay at Moster IL.

Other popular sports and activities include team handball, motocross, athletics, shooting sports, social dance, floorball, baton twirling, rhythmic gymnastics, swimming, and martial arts.

Industry and economy

Wärtsilä, Eidesvik Offshore, Brandasund fiskeforedling, and Bremnes Seashore are notable industries, all of which are active in industries somehow related to the ocean. This, as well as tourism and agriculture, constitutes the main industries of Bømlo.

The economy of Bømlo is largely sustained by Eidesvik Offshore, Wärtsilä, fishing industry, tourism and general offshore related work.

Education
There are several schools in the area. They are all named according to their geographical locations, and include Svortland, Gilje, Meling, Folderøy, Våge, Håvik, and Espevær, which comprises students from 1st through 7th grade. Rubbestadneset, Moster, and Hillestveit have students from 1st through 10th grade. Bremnes Ungdomsskule, often abbreviated BUS, is located in Svortland, and gathers most students from 8th through 10th grade. There are two upper secondary schools, Bømlo Vidaregåande skule and Rubbestadnes Vidaregåande Skule (formerly Rubbestadnes Yrkesskule).

There is also a Folk High School, Olavskulen Folkehøgskule, which is located at Finnås.

Transport
An extensive tunnel and bridge system, the Triangle Link, connected Bømlo to the mainland and neighboring island Stord on 30 April 2001. It was officially opened on the latter date by king Harald V of Norway. The system includes the Bømlafjord Tunnel, the Bømla Bridge, and the Stord Bridge. The Norwegian County Road 542 is one of the main roads in Bømlo.

There is also a ferry that goes from Langevåg to Buavåg in Sveio, connecting the southern part of Bømlo to the mainland.

Notable people 

 Niels Hertzberg (1759 Finnås – 1841) a Norwegian priest and politician
 Gerhard Meidell Gerhardsen (1912 in Finnaas – 1986) a Norwegian economist
 Finn Haldorsen (1934 in Rubbestadneset – 2005) a Norwegian businessman, set up the Rubb group
 Kjell Habbestad (born 1955 in Bømlo) a Norwegian contemporary composer
 Kenneth Sivertsen (1961 in Bømlo – 2006) a musician, composer, poet, and comedian
 Heine Totland (born 1970 in Moster) a Norwegian singer 
 Knut Arild Hareide (born 1972 in Rubbestadneset) a Norwegian politician

Sport 
 Arne Larsen Økland (born 1954 in Bømlo) a former footballer with 280 club caps and 54 for Norway
 Joakim Våge Nilsen (born 1991 in Bømlo) a Norwegian footballer with 240 club caps

References

External links

Municipal fact sheet from Statistics Norway 
Municipality web site 
Map
Weather radar at Bømlo
Bømlo tourist information

 
Municipalities of Vestland
1916 establishments in Norway
Archipelagoes of Norway